410 and 410 BC are years.

410 may also refer to:

 .410 bore, the smallest caliber of shotgun shell commonly available
 List of highways numbered 410
 Area codes 410 and 443
 Locust bean gum food additive
 Messerschmitt Me 410 German combat aircraft during World War 2
 The HTTP status code "410 Gone", to indicate that the resource requested is no longer available

See also
4/10 (disambiguation)